Pimpf may refer to:

 Pimpfe, a German nickname for a boy before the voice change and the youngest members of the Hitler Youth organization in Nazi Germany
 Der Pimpf, the Nazi magazine for boys
 "Pimpf" (song), the B-side of Depeche Mode's 1987 single "Strangelove"
 "Pimpf", a short story by Charles Stross in his 2006 story collection The Jennifer Morgue